Manitowish Waters is a town in Vilas County, Wisconsin, United States. The population was 566 in the 2010 census. The unincorporated community Manitowish Waters, is also located within the town.

History 
In 1934, at the Little Bohemia Lodge on Little Star Lake, the FBI and Dillinger Gang were involved in a shootout, which resulted in the accidental shooting death of one local Civilian Conservation Corps worker and severely injuring two other workers by federal agents who mistook them for members of the gang. Agent W. Carter Baum was also shot and killed by Baby Face Nelson in a brief gunfight a short distance away, which resulted in another special agent and a local constable being wounded. All six members of the gang escaped the incident unharmed.

The lodge, then owned by Emil Wanatka, remains in existence as a restaurant today without lodging. Bullet holes in the building's siding and windows from the shootout are still visible. Personal items left behind by the hasty departure of the Dillinger Gang members have been preserved and are on display. In the summer of 2008, the Little Bohemia Lodge was used in the filming of a re-creation of these events in the 2009 Michael Mann film Public Enemies, a movie about Dillinger and the FBI starring Johnny Depp as John Dillinger and Christian Bale as Melvin Purvis.

Geography
According to the United States Census Bureau, the town has a total area of 36.4 square miles (94.4 km2), of which, 30.4 square miles (78.6 km2) of it is land and 6.1 square miles (15.7 km2) of it (16.69%) is water.

Airport
Manitowish Waters is served by the Manitowish Waters Airport (D25). Located one mile south of the city, the airport handles approximately 6,200 operations per year, with roughly 96% general aviation and 4% air taxi.

Demographics
As of the census of 2000, there were 646 people, 301 households, and 208 families residing in the town. The population density was 21.3 people per square mile (8.2/km2). There were 1,103 housing units at an average density of 36.3 per square mile (14.0/km2). The racial makeup of the town was 99.07% White, 0.46% from other races, and 0.46% from two or more races. Hispanic or Latino of any race were 2.01% of the population.

There were 301 households, out of which 19.6% had children under the age of 18 living with them, 64.5% were married couples living together, 2.7% had a female householder with no husband present, and 30.6% were non-families. 27.6% of all households were made up of individuals, and 14.6% had someone living alone who was 65 years of age or older. The average household size was 2.15 and the average family size was 2.56.

In the town, the population was spread out, with 16.1% under the age of 18, 2.8% from 18 to 24, 21.5% from 25 to 44, 30.2% from 45 to 64, and 29.4% who were 65 years of age or older. The median age was 51 years. For every 100 females, there were 113.2 males. For every 100 females age 18 and over, there were 103.0 males.

The median income for a household in the town was $37,500, and the median income for a family was $49,375. Males had a median income of $36,518 versus $20,114 for females. The per capita income for the town was $21,042. About 5.9% of families and 10.5% of the population were below the poverty line, including 6.1% of those under age 18 and 13.6% of those age 65 or over.

Tourism
The town is best known for its chain of lakes. During the summer, the population increases dramatically as tourists come from all around the Midwest.

It is also known as an artists' enclave, with many artist studios and gift shops located in the town square and surrounding areas. Another tourist attraction is the water ski team, the Skiing Skeeters, who perform free shows two nights a week throughout the summer.

Gallery

References

External links
Manitowish Waters Chamber of Commerce
Manitowish Waters Lakes Association
Manitowish Waters Public Library (Frank B. Koller Memorial Library)

Towns in Vilas County, Wisconsin
Towns in Wisconsin